Duchy of Łęczyca was one of the duchies of Poland. It was created around 1231 from the Seniorate Province by Konrad I of Masovia. In 1264 the Duchy of Sieradz was split from it. The last duke of this duchy was Władysław the Hunchback. After his death in 1352 the duchy became part of the Kingdom of Poland and was reorganized into the Łęczyca Voivodeship.

Duchy of Leczyca
14th-century disestablishments in Poland
Former countries in Europe
States and territories established in 1231
States and territories disestablished in 1352
Duchies of Poland
Fiefdoms of Poland